Quinten Xerxes van Dalm  (born 26 June 1972) is a former Dutch badminton player, and later represented Denmark. He competed at the 2000 Summer Olympics in the men's doubles event partnered with Dennis Lens. He was part of the Netherlands national team that won the mixed team bronze at the 2000 European Championships in Glasgow. He had collected 11 times national title, 8 in the men's doubles event and 3 times in the mixed doubles event. His brother, Edwin, also a Dutch badminton player. He married a former Danish badminton player, Mette Sørensen, and now lived in Brønderslev, Denmark.

Achievements

IBF International
Men's doubles

Mixed doubles

References

External links
 
 
 

1972 births
Living people
Sportspeople from Eindhoven
Dutch male badminton players
Danish male badminton players
Olympic badminton players of the Netherlands
Badminton players at the 2000 Summer Olympics